Deep Silver Dambuster Studios Ltd. is a British video game developer based in Nottingham, England. The studio was set up by Deep Silver on 30 July 2014 to take over the development of Homefront: The Revolution from Crytek UK, which was closed later that same day, transferring all of its employees to Dambuster Studios.

History 

Dambuster Studios was founded on 30 July 2014. Its predecessor, Crytek UK (formerly known as Free Radical Design), was a subsidiary of Crytek. Crytek in 2014 suffered a financial crisis due to internal structuring, and was unable to pay wages to the staff members at the UK studio. The company at that time was working on Homefront: The Revolution, but Crytek decided to sell the franchise to Deep Silver and closed down the studio. Most of its staff members were moved to Dambuster Studios, a studio founded by Deep Silver, in accordance with British law, to continue Homefront: The Revolutions development. Dambuster Studios is the third Deep Silver in-house development team, following Volition and Fishlabs. By August 2019, Dambuster had taken over the development on Dead Island 2 from Sumo Digital, and had 140 employees.

Games developed

References

External links 
 

2014 establishments in England
British companies established in 2014
Companies based in Nottingham
Deep Silver
Video game companies established in 2014
Video game companies of the United Kingdom
Video game development companies
British subsidiaries of foreign companies